The Gorizia Hills ( or Collio;  or Brda) is a hilly microregion in western Slovenia and northeastern Italy. It lies on the right bank of the Soča (Isonzo) river, north of the Italian town of Gorizia, after which it is named. The region has around 120 square kilometres and 7,000 inhabitants, mostly ethnic Slovenes, with a small number of Friulian speakers in its westernmost part (in the municipality of Dolegna del Collio).

Today, the majority of the region is in Slovenia, with around 60% of the territory and 80% of the inhabitants. The Slovene part of the Gorizia Hills lies entirely in the Municipality of Brda. The Italian part lies within the boundaries of the Province of Gorizia, and it's divided among the municipalities of San Floriano del Collio, Cormons and Dolegna del Collio.

The region is predominately a white wine producer with Friulano, Ribolla Gialla, Malvasia Istriana, Chardonnay, Pinot bianco, Pinot grigio and Sauvignon blanc being the leading varietals. Red wine is produced under the Collio Rosso designation and is usually a blend of Merlot, Cabernet franc and Cabernet Sauvignon.

In Italy, the Gorizia Hills are designated Denominazione di origine controllata (DOC) and belong to the Italian wine region of  Friuli-Venezia Giulia. The DOC is located in the province of Gorizia near the border with Slovenia.  Some Slovene wine from the region of Brda also carry the designation of Collio due to their vineyards overlapping across the Italian border.

History
The history of the Gorizia Hills has been influenced by its close Italian-Friulian, Slavic and Austro-Hungarian ties. Historically part of the Patria del Friuli, then later the County of Gorizia, it was annexed to the Kingdom of Italy after the First World War. After the Second World War, the majority of the region became part of Yugoslavia, and only a small strip of territory between the villages of San Floriano del Collio and Dolegna del Collio remained in Italy. The boundaries of the traditional wine region thus extended further eastward into what is now Slovenia. In the 1970s, the Collio Goriziano was one of the Italy's leading white wine producers and was pioneer in producing fresher, more vibrant white wines  using winemaking methodology that focused on minimizing skin contact and oxidation.

Geography
The name Collio is taken from the Italian word Colli, which means 'hillsides' and describes the terrain of the Collio Goriziano region. The Slovene name Brda has the same meaning.

The Gorizia Hills extend from the Judrio river in the west where it borders the Colli Orientali del Friuli DOC to the Slovene border on the east. The region continues into Slovenia, where it is entirely included in the Municipality of Brda, which extends from the Italian border to the Soča (Isonzo) River.

To the south is the Isonzo del Friuli DOC, also in the Gorizia province. Most of the region's vineyards are centered on the comune of Cormons. The soil of the region is composed of calcareous marl and flysch sandstone.

Viticulture and winemaking

The Collio Goriziano is the fourth-largest DOC in the Friuli-Venezia Giulia in terms of areas planted. It is also the 4th leading producer in terms of volume, trailing the Friuli Grave, Isonzo and Colli Orientali del Friuli region in production. Over 85% of the Collio production is in white wine grape varieties. While still low in comparison to the rest of Italy, the yields in the Collio Goriziano are higher than the 3.5 tons an acre average of the Friuli-Venezia Giulia. In the Collio, the yields average around 4.4 tons/acre (77 hectolitres/hectare) though some quality conscious producers have lower yields.

Winemaker Mario Schiopetto was one of the first to incorporate German winemaking techniques like cold fermentation to white wine production in the Collio Goriziano. Today, winemaking on the region is very technologically advance with refrigerated fermentation tanks, pneumatic wine presses, and centrifugation bottling systems. The objective of most Gorizia Hills winemakers is to maximize the fresh fruit and pure varietal characteristic of the grape. To that extent, oak influence is not widely used in this region though some winemaking are experimenting with its use and different blends of grape varieties to produce more complex wine.

See also
Uskok War

References

Landforms of Friuli-Venezia Giulia
Hills in the Slovene Littoral
Hills of Italy